Tebogo Chichi Letswalo (born 14 September 1981), is a South African television actress and presenter. She is best known for the roles in the television serials; Generations, Isithembiso and Lingashoni.

Personal life
Letswalo was born on 14 September 1981 in Alexandra, Gauteng, a township outside Johannesburg, South Africa as the eldest in a family with three siblings. She completed education from Wendywood High School. She attended the Akademie vir Dramakuns for two years.

During an interview, she said, she wants to live alone, without a husband and kids.

Career
She was selected as a presenter during the SABC3 reality program The Wedding Show held in the Rosebank Mall in Johannesburg in 2003. She co-presented the show with Ed Jordan. In 2007, she moved to New York and studied performing arts at the Michael Howard School of Film, Theatre and Television. After five year life at USA, she returned to South Africa in 2012. She also presented promotion programs such as; Ciao Cocktails and Handy Andy Homemaker show.

In 2014, she made television acting debut with the soapie Generations and played the role "Zandi Mbisi". Then she made minor roles in many soap operas such as e.tv. drama Backstage, the SABC1 drama Tshisa. In 2013, she joined with the show Zaziwa. In 2017, she joined with the recurring cast of the Mzansi Magic television soapie Isithembiso where she played the role "Claudia Kunene" in first two seasons. Then in 2019, she played the role "Dipuo Lesolle" in the serial Grassroots. In 2021, she joined with first season of the serial Lingashoni to play the role of "Mrs Mkhize".

Filmography

References

External links
 IMDb

Living people
South African television actresses
1981 births